Saïd Ennjimi (born 13 June 1973) is a French-Moroccan football referee. He is registered as a Fédéral 1 referee in France meaning he is eligible to officiate Ligue 1 and Ligue 2 matches, as well as matches in the Coupe de France and Coupe de la Ligue.

Ennjimi became a FIFA referee in 2008.

References

External links
 FFF Profile

1970 births
Living people
French sportspeople of Moroccan descent
French football referees
Moroccan football referees
Sportspeople from Casablanca